Castle Acre Priory was a Cluniac priory in the village of Castle Acre, Norfolk, England, dedicated to St Mary, St Peter, and St Paul. It is thought to have been founded in 1089 by William de Warenne, 2nd Earl of Surrey (the son of the 1st Earl of Surrey who had founded England's first Cluniac priory at Lewes in 1077). The order originated from Burgundy. Originally the priory was sited within the walls of Castle Acre Castle, but this proved too small and inconvenient for the monks; hence, the priory was relocated to the present site in the castle grounds about one year later.

The priory was dissolved in 1537, and its ruins are in the care of English Heritage, along with the nearby Castle Acre Bailey Gate and Castle Acre Castle.

Description
The church itself was consecrated sometime between 1146 and 1148. While the Warenne family may have been the main benefactors of the priory, others also gave generously to it, for example Scolland of Bedale, steward of Alan Earl of Richmond, who was in fact buried there. Like other Cluniac houses, Castle Acre Priory was directly subject to the authority of the Abbot of Cluny; for practical reasons, however, the Prior of Lewes was usually instructed to act for the abbot when any problems arose at Castle Acre. However, this obedience owed to a foreign abbot caused difficulties when the kings of England were at odds with France and/or Burgundy. In the mid 14th century the English Cluniacs settled this difficulty by buying a special legal recognition from the king as 'native' religious houses. The priory was home to some 20 to 30 monks.

The nave of the church is one of the oldest parts of the ruin. Subsequent additions continued to be added until the priory was dissolved in 1537 under Henry VIII, and when the King gave the dissolved priory to the Duke of Norfolk complete with its estates, the remaining monks were turned out.

The estates eventually passed to Sir Edward Coke, whose descendant, the Earl of Leicester now owns the ruins and Castle Acre Castle.

The ruins today are very impressive, the great west front of the building is almost complete, and the prior's lodging is in a similar condition.

Media appearances
Scenes throughout The Tomb of Ligeia classic horror movie (1964, directed by Roger Corman, starring Vincent Price), were shot at Castle Acre Priory ruins.

The priory was also used in the award-winning Children's TV Show Knightmare as "The Ruins of Dungarth". It also features prominently in the film Glorious 39.

See also
List of monastic houses in Norfolk
List of monastic houses in England

References

External links

 Castle Acre Priory page at English Heritage
Information for teachers from English Heritage

1089 establishments in England
Christian monasteries established in the 11th century
1537 disestablishments in England
Benedictine monasteries in England
English Heritage sites in Norfolk
Monasteries in Norfolk
Grade I listed buildings in Norfolk
Museums in Norfolk
Religious museums in England
Monasteries dissolved under the English Reformation